Ganthalawa railway station is a railway station in the town of Ganthalawa in eastern Sri Lanka. Owned by Sri Lanka Railways, the state-owned railway operator, the station is part of the Trincomalee Line, which links Trincomalee District with the capital Colombo.

The station was officially opened on 5 May 2008 by the Minister of Transport, Dullas Alahapperuma, as part of the government's "Eastern Reawakening" program.

Services

See also
 List of railway stations in Sri Lanka
 List of railway stations by line order in Sri Lanka

Railway stations in Trincomalee District
Railway stations on the Trincomalee Line

References